The Philippines competed at the 30th Southeast Asian Games which was hosted by them from 30 November to 11 December 2019. This was the fourth time that the country hosted the biennial meet.

The country placed 1st again in the medal tally with 149 gold medals and 36 higher than the 23rd SEA Games in 2005 wherein the Philippines also hosted and placed 1st.

The host Philippines emerged in the medal tally as the overall champion for the first time in 14 years breaking its own medal count record in 2005.

Preparations

Monsour del Rosario was tasked to prepare the Philippine delegation to the 2019 Southeast Asian Games as its chef de mission. He along with other appointed officials by the Philippine Olympic Committee was fired from their post on July 27, 2019 by then-President of the  Ricky Vargas due to a "loss of trust and confidence". He was then replaced on July 29, 2019 by Philippine Sports Commission Chairman Butch Ramirez after being convinced by his superiors in the Philippine government who initially declined to be appointed the day before. Ada Milby of rugby and Stephen Fernandez of taekwondo were named as Ramirez's deputies.

As host, Filipino athletes has the advantage of accessing the facilities to be used in the Games. It is projected that by mid-August 2019, Filipino athletes can already move in the Athlete's Village of the New Clark City Sports Hub so they can have easy and early access to the sports complex's facilities. On July 3, 2019, the track oval of the Athletics Stadium was made available to use for training of Filipino track and field athletes even if the stadium is still under construction.

The official training attire of the Philippine delegation is a predominantly red tracksuit which were provided by Asics. The attire of the delegation to be worn in the parade is a Barong Tagalog-inspired clothing was conceptualized by Filipino designer Francis Libiran. The parade attire features a detachable blue and red collar alluding to the Philippine flag and an embossed sun rays motif on the clothes sleeves.

The Philippines as hosts have the largest delegation to the games which consist of 1,115 athletes, 753 coaches and officials. The delegation will have six flagbearers at the opening ceremony: Hidilyn Diaz (weightlifting), Margielyn Didal (skateboarding), EJ Obiena (pole vault), Eumir Marcial (boxing), Nesthy Petecio (boxing), and Kiyomi Watanabe (judo).

Medalists
Medalists are entitled to incentive from the government through the Philippine Sports Commission per R.A. 10699.

Gold

Silver

Bronze

Demonstration Sport
Medals earned on a Demonstration Sport is not counted on the medal haul

Multiple Medalists

Medal summary

By sports

By date

Aquatics

27 athletes will compete for the Philippines in swimming events of the 2019 Southeast Asian Games. 14 of them are male and 13 of them are female. Sherwyn Santiago will serve as the coach for the men's team while Jenny Guerrero will coach the women's team.

Arnis

Athletics

Billiards and Snooker

Basketball

The Philippine men's national basketball team will be coached by Tim Cone. Yeng Guiao was expected to coach the national team but resigned after the conclusion of the 2019 FIBA Basketball World Cup. The official 24-man roster for the Southeast Asian Games is expected to be submitted in August 2019 which is to be composed of a mixture of both amateur and professional players. Guiao has stated that he would not call up naturalized player, Andray Blatche or Jordan Clarkson assessing that there is a deep enough pool to choose players from to form a competitive team that could contend for the gold medal. 17 players from the Philippine FIBA World Cup national training pool as of mid-August 2019 is also guaranteed a slot in the 24-man squad for the Southeast Asian Games.

Roster

Esports

The Philippine Southeast Asian Games E-sports Union, the organizing body for the esport event of the 2019 Southeast Asian Games has dubbed the Philippine national esports team as Sibol. In late July 2019, the organization announced a training pool for the Sibol national team and is set to organize qualifying tournaments for additional pool members in August 2019. The qualifiers are to be participated by invited players from the country's professional esports teams and was also made open to additional competitors who are Filipino citizens of at least 13 years of age. The Philippines, as host will participate in all 6 esports events with each event to be participated by 7 players, except for Tekken, Hearthstone, and StarCraft II which will consist of two players each.

Gymnastics

Obstacle racing

16 athletes will represent the Philippines in obstacle racing.

Skateboarding

Eleven athletes will compete for the Philippines in skateboarding including Margielyn Didal, Christiana Means, and Jericho Francisco.

Triathlon

Four athletes will represent the Philippines in the men's and women's elite in triathlon. They are John Leerams Chicano, Andrew Kim Remolino, Kim Mangrobang and Kim Kilgroe.

Table Tennis

Singles

Doubles

Tennis

Volleyball

Beach volleyball
The 2019 Beach Volleyball delegates are Sisi Rondina, Bernadeth Pons, Dzi Gervacio, and Floremel Rodrigues. They will be part of the women's teams. For men's division, the teams compose of Edmar Bonono, Jude Garcia, Anthony Arbasto, and James Buytrago.

References

Southeast Asian Games
2019
Nations at the 2019 Southeast Asian Games